The Welsh History Review (Welsh: Cylchgrawn Hanes Cymru) is a peer-reviewed academic journal covering the history of Wales. It is published in four parts per volume, one volume every two years. The journal was established in 1960. The editors-in-chief are Huw Pryce (Bangor University) and Paul O'Leary (Aberystwyth University).

External links 
 
 The Welsh History Review Vols 1–20 at Welsh Journals Online

History of Wales
Welsh history journals
Publications established in 1960
Multilingual journals
Biannual journals
University of Wales